is a 2007 Japanese action adventure anime television series based on the a strategic game called Bakugan developed by Sega Toys and Spin Master. The series was produced by TMS Entertainment and Japan Vistec under the direction of Mitsuo Hashimoto. The story centers on the lives of creatures called Bakugan and the battle brawlers who possess them.

The series first premiered in Japan on TV Tokyo on April 5, 2007, and was rebroadcast six days later on BS Japan. Nelvana Enterprises produced an English version which aired on the Canadian television network Teletoon in July 8, 2007. Cartoon Network, an American television station also premiered the series on February 24, 2008. The series was followed by a sequel, Bakugan Battle Brawlers: New Vestroia, in 2009.

Four pieces of theme music are used for the series; two opening themes by Psychic Lover and two closing themes. Thirteen DVD compilations of four episodes each were released by Sega in Japan. The first compilation was released on July 25, 2007 with the thirteenth compilation released on July 25, 2008. In North America, eight DVD compilations were released by Nelvana in Canada and Sony Pictures Home Entertainment in the United States.  For the U.S. release, Volumes 1 and 6 contained 5 episodes each, volumes 2 through 5 each had 4 episodes, and the seventh and eighth volumes, titled Chapter 1 and 2, each had 13 episodes. The first compilation was released on August 26, 2008 with the eighth compilation released on July 6, 2010.

Episode list

See also 
 List of Bakugan Battle Brawlers: New Vestroia episodes
 List of Bakugan: Gundalian Invaders episodes
 List of Bakugan: Mechtanium Surge episodes

References 
 General

 
 
 
 

 Specific

External links 
 TMS Entertainment's Bakugan Battle Brawlers advertisement  
 TV Tokyo's Bakugan Battle Brawlers website 
 Nelvana's Bakugan Battle Brawlers website 

2007 Canadian television seasons
2008 Japanese television seasons
Bakugan episode lists
2007 Japanese television seasons
2008 Canadian television seasons

es:Anexo:Episodios de Bakugan Battle Brawlers